Sunny Border Blue is the fifth studio album by American singer-songwriter Kristin Hersh. The album peaked at #93 on the Official UK Albums Chart. It also peaked at #50 on the US's Billboard Heatseekers Album Chart and, #33 on the US's Billboard Top Independent Albums chart.

Critical reception

Sunny Border Blue was met with "universal acclaim" reviews from critics. At Metacritic, which assigns a weighted average rating out of 100 to reviews from mainstream publications, this release received an average score of 81, based on 15 reviews. Aggregator Album of the Year gave the release a 79 out of 100 based on a critical consensus of 7 reviews.

Track listings

Charts

References

External links
 SBB at the throwingmusic.com online store
 SBB at 4AD

2001 albums
Kristin Hersh albums
4AD albums